Gerhard Brockmüller (born 12 March 1941) is a German equestrian. He competed at the 1968 Summer Olympics and the 1972 Summer Olympics.

References

External links
 

1941 births
Living people
German male equestrians
Olympic equestrians of East Germany
Equestrians at the 1968 Summer Olympics
Equestrians at the 1972 Summer Olympics
People from Lüneburg (district)
Sportspeople from Lower Saxony